Teslyn Siobhan Barkman (born 17 November 1987) is a Falkland Island journalist and politician who has served as a Member of the Legislative Assembly for the Camp constituency since the 2017 general election. Prior to entering politics, she was a journalist for Penguin News.

Career 
While working for Penguin News, she publicly expressed concern about plans for Members of the Legislative Assembly to earn a full-time wage of £40,000 stating that it was too high and wouldn't attract suitable candidates. In 2013, she was part of a delegation that travelled to the United States to lobby the United States Congress to recognise the results of the 2013 Falkland Islands sovereignty referendum. Later that year, she stood for election in the 2013 Falkland Islands general election being one of the youngest candidates standing and the only one under thirty. However she failed to win a seat in the Stanley constituency by finishing sixth.

In 2014 she started work at the Public Relations and Media Office for Falkland Islands Government.
Following this, in 2017, she stood for election to the Legislative Assembly of the Falkland Islands again, this time standing in the Camp constituency. Barkman won a seat in the Legislative Assembly at the 2017 Falkland Islands general election by gathering the second largest number of votes in the Camp constituency and also became the youngest ever woman to be elected into the Legislative Assembly of the Falklands at 29.

References

 

1987 births
Living people
21st-century British women politicians
Falkland Islands journalists
Falkland Islands MLAs 2017–2021
Falkland Islands MLAs 2021–2025
Falkland Islands women in politics
People from Stanley, Falkland Islands